Anthony Junior Witter (born 12 August 1965) is an English retired footballer who played during the 1980s and 1990s.

Witter was a central defender who played for numerous clubs during his career including Millwall, Scunthorpe United and Bohemians amongst others. He spent nearly seven years at Millwall making 104 league appearances, scoring two goals. He made a solitary appearance for Bohemians, against Galway United in December 1999.

He held the record for the quickest goal scored for Plymouth Argyle by a player on his debut until Jamie Mackie broke it on 12 February 2008, against Barnsley.

References

External links

1965 births
Living people
English footballers
Association football defenders
Grays Athletic F.C. players
Crystal Palace F.C. players
Queens Park Rangers F.C. players
Plymouth Argyle F.C. players
Reading F.C. players
Millwall F.C. players
Northampton Town F.C. players
Torquay United F.C. players
Welling United F.C. players
Scunthorpe United F.C. players
Hayes F.C. players
Enfield F.C. players
Bohemian F.C. players
English Football League players
Premier League players
League of Ireland players
Expatriate association footballers in the Republic of Ireland